Sonnet 44 is one of 154 sonnets written by the English playwright and poet William Shakespeare. It is a member of the Fair Youth sequence, in which the poet expresses his love towards a young man. Sonnet 44 is continued in Sonnet 45.

Structure
Sonnet 44 is an English or Shakespearean sonnet, which contains three quatrains followed by a final rhyming couplet. It follows the typical rhyme scheme of the form, ABAB CDCD EFEF GG, and is written in iambic pentameter, a type of poetic metre based on five pairs of metrically weak/strong syllabic positions. The fifth line exemplifies a regular iambic pentameter:

 ×  /  ×    /  ×   /     ×  /    ×    / 
No matter then although my foot did stand (44.5)
/ = ictus, a metrically strong syllabic position. × = nonictus.

The sonnet is quite regular metrically (for example, a three-syllable "injurious" maintains regularity in line two), but implements a few variations, for example in the first and last lines:

 ×   ×  /    /   ×    /   ×   /    ×     / 
If the dull substance of my flesh were thought, (44.1)

 ×   /  ×  /      /  ×  ×  /   ×     / 
But heavy tears, badges of either's woe. (44.14)

...which contain, respectively, a rightward movement of the first ictus (resulting in a four-position figure, × × / /, sometimes referred to as a minor ionic), and a mid-line reversal ("badges").

Criticism
Critics have mentioned Sonnet 44 is directly coupled to Sonnet 45 and lacks a definite conclusion.

Recordings
Poeterra, for the 2014 album, When in Disgrace
Paul Kelly, for the 2016 album, Seven Sonnets & a Song

References

Further reading

External links
Analysis
Shakespeare Online

British poems
Sonnets by William Shakespeare